TKE may refer to:

 Tau Kappa Epsilon, a college fraternity.
 Turbulence kinetic energy, a property of turbulent flows.
 Tenakee Seaplane Base, Tenakee Springs, Alaska, IATA code TKE
 TK Elevators,